Butler Township is one of the eighteen townships of Columbiana County, Ohio, United States. As of the 2010 census the population was 3,614.

Geography
Located in the northwestern part of the county, it borders the following townships:
Goshen Township, Mahoning County - north
Perry Township - northeast
Salem Township - east
Center Township - southeast corner
Hanover Township - south
West Township - southwest corner
Knox Township - west
Smith Township, Mahoning County - northwest corner

Two unincorporated communities are located in Butler Township:
The unincorporated community of Damascus, in the northwest
The unincorporated community of Winona, in the southeast

Name and history

It is one of six Butler Townships statewide.
The township was organized in 1806.

Government
The township is governed by a three-member board of trustees, who are elected in November of odd-numbered years to a four-year term beginning on the following January 1. Two are elected in the year after the presidential election and one is elected in the year before it. There is also an elected township fiscal officer, who serves a four-year term beginning on April 1 of the year after the election, which is held in November of the year before the presidential election. Vacancies in the fiscal officership or on the board of trustees are filled by the remaining trustees.

Township Trustees
Matthew S. Hall, Chairman
Thomas G. Sanor, Vice Chairman
Paul Lease

Fiscal Officer
Jill M. Amos

References

External links
County website

Townships in Columbiana County, Ohio
1806 establishments in Ohio
Townships in Ohio